This is a list of disused, abandoned, closed or dismantled railway lines in South Africa since 1910.

The list is primarily intended to document South African Railways (Government) or private lines of historical significance. (e.g.: Okiep railway)

Closed Lines

Re-opened
 Klipplaat - Graaf-Reinet closed in 2001, re-opened 2015.
 Graaff-Reinet - Rosmead, closed in 1993, re-opened in 2015.
 Wolseley - Prince Alfred Hamlet (branch line), closed c.2002, re-opened in 2015.
 Belmont - Douglas, Upgraded 2013/2014.

Unsure Status
 Firham - Vrede
 Kaapmuiden - Barberton
 Nelspruit - Plaston
 Buhrmannskop - Lothair
 Makwassie - Vermaas
 Vermaas - Pudimoe
 Klerksdorp - Ottosdal
 Franklin - Matatiele
 Franklin - Kokstad
 Ennersdale - Bergville
 Schroeders - Bruyns Hill
 Dalton - Glenside
 Chailley - Mount Alida
 Greytown - Kranskop
 Dreunberg - Zastron
 Addo - Kirkwood

References

Railway stations, closed

Sou